Brecknock Society and Museum Friends is a Welsh historical society that promotes "the study and understanding of the Archaeology, History, Geology, Natural History, the Arts and Literature of Wales, especially the historic county of Brecknock."

The Brecknock Society was founded in 1928. In 1929 they made a successful appeal for the government to purchase Tretower Court, which had become badly neglected. The society handed the museum and its collections to the Breconshire County Council in 1950. In 1986 the Brecknock Society merged with the Friends of Brecknock Museum to form the Brecknock Society and Museum Friends.

The organization publishes the historical journal Brycheiniog since 1955. It also awards the annual Roland Mathias Prize, a literary prize named after author Roland Mathias. In 2007, they successfully petitioned for government funds to restore the Brecknock Museum and Art Gallery.

References

External links
Brecknock Society and Museum Friends

Non-profit organisations based in Wales
1928 establishments in the United Kingdom
Organizations established in 1928
Historical societies of the United Kingdom
Organisations based in Powys
Cultural organisations based in Wales